The Alpha Delta Phi Fraternity House was a historic fraternity house located at the University of Illinois at Urbana–Champaign in Champaign, Illinois. The house was built in 1924-25 for the university's chapter of the Alpha Delta Phi fraternity, which formed in 1903.

During its early years, the fraternity's members included several prominent university athletes. Architect Ralph W. Varney designed the building in the Tudor Revival style. The house's design reflected the formal Jacobethan subtype of Tudor Revival architecture, which could be seen in its extensive stone decorations on its brick exterior, such as quoins and oriels, and its steep gable roof with gabled dormers. Half-timbering, a common feature of informal Tudor Revival designs, was notably absent.

The building was added to the National Register of Historic Places on May 21, 1990. By 2015, the chapter house was empty and the fraternity planned to build a new structure. The building was demolished in January 2018 to make room for an apartment building.

See also
 Alpha Delta Psi

References

Residential buildings on the National Register of Historic Places in Illinois
Tudor Revival architecture in the United States
Houses completed in 1925
National Register of Historic Places in Champaign County, Illinois
Buildings and structures of the University of Illinois Urbana-Champaign
Fraternity and sorority houses
Buildings and structures in Champaign, Illinois
Buildings and structures demolished in 2018
Demolished buildings and structures in Illinois